Proposition 47, also known by its ballot title Criminal Sentences. Misdemeanor Penalties. Initiative Statute, was a referendum passed by voters in the state of California on November 4, 2014. The measure was also referred to by its supporters as the Safe Neighborhoods and Schools Act. It recategorized some nonviolent offenses as misdemeanors, rather than felonies, as they had previously been categorized.

The crimes affected were:
 Shoplifting, where the value of property stolen does not exceed $950
 Grand theft, where the value of the stolen property does not exceed $950
 Receiving stolen property, where the value of the property does not exceed $950
 Forgery, where the value of forged check, bond or bill does not exceed $950
 Fraud, where the value of the fraudulent check, draft or order does not exceed $950
 Writing a bad check, where the value of the check does not exceed $950
 Personal use of most illegal drugs (Below a certain threshold of weight)

Effects
The measure's main effects were to convert many nonviolent offenses, such as drug and property offenses, from felonies to misdemeanors. These offenses include shoplifting, writing bad checks, and drug possession. The measure also required that money saved as a result of the measure would be spent on "school truancy and dropout prevention, victim services, mental health, and drug abuse treatment, and other programs designed to keep offenders out of prison and jail." The measure included exceptions for offenses involving more than $950 and criminals with records including violence or sex offenses. For example, forgery had previously been a "wobbler" offense that could be charged by the prosecutor as a misdemeanor or a felony.  Now with the passage of Proposition 47, prosecutors cannot charge a forgery involving less than $950 as a felony unless the defendant has a criminal record.

The measure both affects future convictions and allows for people currently incarcerated for crimes covered by the measure to petition for re-sentencing.

In November 2015, a report by the Stanford University Justice Advocacy Project authored by the co-author of Proposition 47, found that Proposition 47 had reduced the state's prison population by 13,000 and that it would save the state about $150 million that year.

For impact on crime rates, see below.

The provision allowing past offenders to petition for resentencing would have expired on November 4, 2017, though governor Jerry Brown approved a bill that extended the deadline to November 4, 2022.

Support
The measure was endorsed by the editorial board of The New York Times, which praised it as a way to reduce overcrowding in the state's prisons. It was also endorsed by the editorial board of the Los Angeles Times, which wrote that the measure was a "good and timely measure that can help the state make smarter use of its criminal justice and incarceration resources." The American Civil Liberties Union also supported the measure and donated $3.5 million to support it.

Prominent individual supporters included Jay-Z and Newt Gingrich.

Opposition
Opponents of the measure include Mark A. Peterson, the District Attorney of Contra Costa County, who wrote before its passage that the measure "would make our neighborhoods and schools less safe". It was also criticized by Nancy O'Malley, the District Attorney of Alameda County, who said it would "expose Californians to significant harm" and called it a "Trojan horse".

Among the most prominent arguments made against the law was that possession of the date-rape drug Rohypnol would, under the law, be punished as a misdemeanor rather than a felony, which critics described as a "slap on the wrist". Critics also argued that not being able to use incarceration to force drug users into treatment would make it more difficult for drug users to enter into a treatment program.

Impact on crime rates
In 2015, the Los Angeles Times reported that "law enforcement officials and others have blamed Proposition 47 for allowing repeat offenders...to continue breaking the law with little consequence." Also that year, a spokesman for George Gascón, the district attorney of San Francisco, said that the law "has made it easier for drug offenders to avoid mandated treatment programs." The mayor of Los Angeles, Eric Garcetti, has also suggested that the law may explain why his city's crime rates went from decreasing to increasing. In a 2015 story in The Washington Post, the police chief of San Diego, Shelley Zimmerman, described Proposition 47 as "a virtual get-out-of-jail-free card." She and other police chiefs also expressed concern about the increasing phenomenon of "frequent flier" criminals–people who exploit Proposition 47 to commit crimes. For example, one criminal allegedly brought a calculator into a store to avoid stealing more than $950 worth of goods. The ACLU responded by releasing a report saying that those who linked Proposition 47 and crime were "making irresponsible and inaccurate statements."

The director of the Stanford Justice Advocacy Project and co-author of Proposition 47, Michael Romano, said in November 2015 that, with respect to Proposition 47, "In the long term, this reallocation of resources should significantly improve public safety". Romano authored a study supporting his conclusion.

A March 2016 report released by the Center on Juvenile and Criminal Justice concluded that it was still too early to determine whether Proposition 47 had an effect on California's crime rates.

A study in June 2018 by the Public Policy Institute of California found evidence that Proposition 47 may have contributed toward an uptick in larceny and auto break-in thefts. The study indicates it found a decline in recidivism and no evidence of an increase in violent crime linked to Proposition 47.

However, a 2018 study from the University of California, Irvine, maintains that Prop 47 was not a "driver" for recent upticks in crime, based upon comparison of data from New York, Nevada, Michigan and New Jersey (states that closely matched California’s crime trends) 1970 to 2015, but that "what the measure did do was cause less harm and suffering to those charged with crime."

Numerous media outlets have continued to report an increase in retail theft related to the passage of Prop 47. Large retailers Safeway, Target, Rite Aid and CVS pharmacies reported in 2016 that shoplifting increased from 15 percent to (in some cases)  over 50 percent since voters approved Proposition 47. The Los Angeles Times reported in 2017 that the California Supreme Court ruled that a person convicted of a felony for stealing a car may have that conviction reduced to a misdemeanor if the vehicle was worth no more than $950, and in 2018 that  researchers found Prop 47 contributed to a jump in car burglaries, shoplifting and other thefts. The San Francisco Chronicle reported in 2018 that Prop. 47 led to a rise in the larceny theft rate of about 9 percent compared to the 2014 rate.

By 2019, organized retail theft was on the rise; police and store owners attributed it to Prop 47. Fox News reported that post Prop 47 both shoplifters and fencers operated openly and with impunity, with both criminals and storekeepers aware that selective enforcement policies mean police largely ignore reports of shoplifting, or respond too slowly. President of the California Retailers Association Rachel Michelin stated that thieves will bring in calculators to ensure that they do not go over the $950 limit and that "one person will go into a store, fill up their backpack, come out, dump it out and go right back in and do it all over again." She also reported that out-of-state crime rings use children as they are even less likely to be prosecuted, and that even when police make arrests, charges are dropped or downgraded by the district attorney.

See also
 2000 California Proposition 36
 2004 California Proposition 66

References

Prison reform
2014 California ballot propositions
November 2014 events in the United States
Criminal penalty ballot measures in the United States